Aegus is a genus of stag beetles in the family Lucanidae. Comprising about 260 species in the genus, they are placed in the largest subfamily Lucaninae. They are distributed in South Asia, Southeast Asia and the Pacific countries, but introduced accidentally to many parts of the islands.

Primarily saproxylic, adult beetles and grubs are commonly found in decaying wood and stumps with abundant fungal growth.

Species
The species show dramatic external intraspecific variation resulting from sexual dimorphism and male polymorphism.

 Aegus acuminatus (Fabricius, 1801)
 Aegus alternatus (Fairmaire 1881)
 Aegus lansbergei Boileau 1902
 Aegus bidens Möllenkamp 1902
 Aegus brevimandibularis Nagai 1994
 Aegus chelifer Macleay, 1819
 Aegus coomani Didier, 1926
 Aegus corniculatus Didier 1928
 Aegus cornutus Boileau, 1899
 Aegus eschscholtzi (Hope 1845)
 Aegus formosae Bates 1866
 Aegus grandis Deyrolle, 1874
 Aegus helleri Nagel 1928
 Aegus hyperpunctatus Boucher, 1996
 Aegus jasmini Araya & Fujioka 2007
 Aegus javanicus Oberthür & Houlbert 1914
 Aegus jengi Huang & Chen, 2016
 Aegus kombaensis Nagel 1941
 Aegus krikkeni Nagai 1994
 Aegus kurosawai Okajima & Ichikawa, 1986
 Aegus laevicollis Saunders 1854
 Aegus lansbergei Boileau, 1902
 Aegus meeki Didier, 1928
 Aegus modiglianii Bomans 1992
 Aegus naungi Nagai & Maeda 2009
 Aegus nakaneorum Ichikawa & Fujita, 1986
 Aegus nitidus Boileau, 1899
 Aegus parvus Boileau 1902
 Aegus parallelus (Hope 1845)
 Aegus philippinensis Deyrolle, 1865
 Aegus planicollis Möllenkamp 1911
 Aegus platyodon Parry, 1862
 Aegus rotundatus Boileau, 1902
 Aegus rubratus Didier 1928
 Aegus sepicanum (Kriesche 1920)
 Aegus sexlineatus Nagel 1928
 Aegus takakuwai Fujita 2010
 Aegus taurus Boileau, 1899
 Aegus westwoodi Boileau, 1899

References

Lucanidae